Richvald (German: Reichwald, rich forest) is a village and municipality in Bardejov District in the Prešov Region of north-east Slovakia.

History
In historical records the village was first mentioned as a German settlement in 1355.

Geography
The municipality lies at an altitude of 375 metres and covers an area of 21.842 km².
It has a population of about 980 people.

The pronunciation of Richvald is not the same as the English word rich (meaning wealthy).  The ch has the breathy sound of the German word ich (which is translated I in English).

During the time that Slovakia was part of Austria-Hungary, the village was listed on Hungarian maps under the name Erdovagas.

The German Luftwaffe took aerial photographs of this village and the surrounding countryside during World War II.  Black and white images may be obtained from the US Department of the Interior, US Geological Survey.   http://www.usgs.gov/pubprod/

External links
 
 
https://web.archive.org/web/20071027094149/http://www.statistics.sk/mosmis/eng/run.html 

Villages and municipalities in Bardejov District
Šariš